Leonard John Allen (born 22 May 1931) is a British wrestler. He competed in the men's freestyle welterweight at the 1964 Summer Olympics. He also represented England and won a bronze medal in 74 kg welterweight, at the 1962 British Empire and Commonwealth Games in Perth, Western Australia.

References

External links
 

1931 births
Living people
British male sport wrestlers
Olympic wrestlers of Great Britain
Wrestlers at the 1964 Summer Olympics
Place of birth missing (living people)
Commonwealth Games medallists in wrestling
Wrestlers at the 1962 British Empire and Commonwealth Games
Commonwealth Games bronze medallists for England
Medallists at the 1962 British Empire and Commonwealth Games